Fring is a civil parish in the English county of Norfolk.
The population remained less than 100 at the 2011 Census and was included in the civil parish of Sedgeford.
For the purposes of local government, it falls within the district of King's Lynn and West Norfolk. There is a small cluster of buildings located along Fring road consisting of Fring All Saints.

The villages name means 'Frea's place'.

In 1870–72 Fring was described as: "a parish in Docking district, Norfolk; 2¾ miles SW of Docking, and 2 ESE of Sedgeford r. station. Post town, Docking, under Lynn. Acres, 1,710. Real property, £2,065. Pop., 173. Houses, 37."

Fring is the traditional source of the River Heacham and a (now) often dry lake bed of approximately one acre marks the point where a spring fed the river. (52°52'56.0"N 0°34'48.4"E).

History
The placename "Fring" appears in the Domesday Book, where it is listed as consisting of "4 villagers. 13 smallholders. 2 freemen. 1 freemen".

Notes 

http://kepn.nottingham.ac.uk/map/place/Norfolk/Fring

External links

King's Lynn and West Norfolk
Villages in Norfolk
Civil parishes in Norfolk